The Herd is an Australian hip hop group formed in Sydney. The group employs a "full band" format and is recognised for its live shows. The Herd is composed of Ozi Batla, Urthboy, Berzerkatron (MCs), Unkle Ho (beats), Traksewt (piano accordion, clarinet and beats), Sulo (beats and guitar), Toe-Fu (guitar), Rok Poshtya (bass) and singer Jane Tyrrell. The band's songs often feature politically oriented lyrics. The group has been largely inactive since 2013, reuniting for select performances.

History

2001–2004: The Herd & An Elefant Never Forgets
The Herd released their debut single "Scallops" in 2001. The song attracted radio airplay on Australian station Triple J. The song combines hip hop culture with Australian "fast food" descriptions including "Like a $3.40 bag of fresh hip hop, From your local fish n' chip shop, Ah Scallops! With dollops of flavour on top, When we do what we do we give heads the bops"

The band's second album, An Elefant Never Forgets was released in 2003. The first single "Burn Down the Parliament", was released the same week as the Canberra bushfires of 2003, despite the unfortunate coincidence, the song's lyrical content was completely unrelated to the natural disaster. The second single "77%", became a prominent song featuring the line: "77% of Aussies are racist"—the lyric is a reference to 2001 Australian survey results regarding the response of the Australian Federal Government, led by then-prime minister John Howard, to the Tampa affair. "77%" was voted into position 46 of the Triple J Hottest 100 of 2003 and, as of October 2004, the album remained in the Australian alternative charts for over 80 weeks.

In a 2004 interview with Dr Tony Mitchell from the University of Technology Sydney (UTS), Ozi Batla explained:

I think the big challenge for Australian hip-hop is for it to expand on those 3000 people who will always buy the CD. The question people have to ask themselves is, who are the other 35000 odd people who bought the Hilltop Hoods album? It's such a small insular and at times disturbingly ignorant little slice of Australia that I think we'd just be banging our heads against the wall trying to get through to those 15-year-old kids. Yeah, I don't know. There's always that responsibility of just trying to keep it true, even though we don't focus on that as much as a lot of acts do, I think it's always in the back of everyone's mind – probably whatever art form it is – that if they really love the art form that they're attempting or drawing influences from then, you know, everyone is always really quite sensitive about other people's perceptions in that culture or community. I think that's the only responsibility, and obviously not to sell out is the other one. But that is pretty unlikely. And I'd say to hopefully bring more people in and that'll change the culture of it, or it'll make that more ignorant style of the culture a bit more isolated. I don't know, to tell you the truth, sometimes I don't feel like we're part of the community that's there at all. And neither are a lot of the artists we know, and even the artists that are respected in that community just throw their hands up and go 'Look, I stopped trying to deal on that level with those fans a long time'".

2005–2007: The Sun Never Sets
The Herd released their third album The Sun Never Sets in 2005, featuring the single "We Can't Hear You". Their subjects ranged from their well-known anti-war stance and anti-corporatism to more personal topics like divorce and the slow death of the Australian outback/country.

In October 2005, The Herd featured live on Triple J's 'Like a Version' (acoustic covers) segment. They performed their own version of the famous Australian 1983 song "I Was Only Nineteen (A Walk in the Light Green)" by Redgum. The song was so well received by fans that it received regular Triple J airplay and was voted #18 in the 2005 Triple J Hottest 100 countdown. They have since recorded a studio version which was included on the 2006 re-release of The Sun Never Sets, and they have also created a video clip for the song. The Herd performed at The Big Day Out 2007. Simon Fellows (Bezerkatron) left the group in late 2006.

In February 2008 the group performed a song about recycled water on the ABC's Sleek Geeks programme.

2008–2010: Summerland
In May 2008, The Herd released its fourth studio album, Summerland. The first single from the album, "The King Is Dead", made reference to Australia's change in government with John Howard being replaced after 11 years as Prime Minister by Kevin Rudd.

The album debuted at number 7 on the ARIA Albums Chart.

2011–present: Future Shade
In celebration of 10 years since the group debuted, the band performed its first live shows in two years in April 2011. The Herd released "The Sum of it All", the first single from the band's fifth album, Future Shade, on 21 March 2011, The album was released in August 2011.

The Herd performed at the WOMADelaide Festival, held at Botanic Park in Adelaide, Australia, in March 2013 and at the tenth anniversary of the Australian hip hop festival Come Together in June 2013.

Activism
In September 2009, The Herd was involved in a controversy regarding the act's inclusion in the line-up for Coal to Coast, a regional youth festival held in Mackay, Queensland, with the local coal industry acting as the event's primary funding source. Concerned fans brought the issue of the Herd's involvement in the festival to the group's attention and the story received national coverage in the mainstream media and debate occurred on Hack, a popular program on national radio station Triple J. As a response, Urthboy released a statement of apology and declared the urgency of global warming; he explained that the group's booking agent, in addition to the Mackay Regional Council, failed to inform the band of the complete nature of the festival. The band proceeded to donate profits from the performance to Greenpeace, as part of the apology.

Twenty-nine hours before the band was due to perform, The Herd pulled out of the festival entirely, as the band members had discovered information—in multiple sources—that the festival was conceived of by Andrew Garratt, the Community Relations Officer at the Dalrymple Bay Coal Terminal. Ozi Batla appeared on 'Hack' to discuss the band's decision to withdraw from the festival, alongside the Queensland Young Liberals leader, who disagreed with the group's decision, and the organiser of the festival.

In response to the proposed dumping of around 3 million cubic metres of dredged seabed onto the Great Barrier Reef, a legal team was formed by World Wide Fund for Nature (WWF)-Australia and the Australian Marine Conservation Society (AMCS) in late 2013/early 2014. The legal team received further support in April 2014, following the release of the "Sounds for the Reef" musical fundraising project. Produced by Straightup, the digital album features The Herd, in addition to artists such as John Butler, Sietta, Missy Higgins, The Cat Empire, Fat Freddys Drop, The Bamboos (featuring Kylie Auldist) and Resin Dogs. Released on 7 April, the album's 21 songs were sold on the Bandcamp website.

Side projects
In April 2005, Unkle Ho released his debut solo album Roads to Roma. The album samples music from a wide variety of international musical genres, such as tango, mariachi, dixieland and blues rock. According to the Elefant Traks website, "[Unkle Ho's] strategy for world peace is to write a song that has every culture in the world represented, so people will drop their guns and dance 'till they can't dance no more." Roads to Roma was acclaimed as "bewitchingly beautiful" by Rolling Stone magazine. Unkle Ho's second album Circus Maximus was released in May 2007.

In 2004, Urthboy released his first solo album, Distant Sense of Random Menace, followed by The Signal (2007), Spitshine (2009), Smokey's Haunt (2012), Smokey's Homies Remix EP (2013) and Live at the City Recital Hall Angel Place (2013).

In 2010, Ozi Batla released his debut album Wild Colonial, while Tyrrell released her debut album Echoes in the Aviary in the second half of 2014.

Discography

Studio albums

Live albums

Remix albums

Single

Awards and nominations
The song "A Thousand Lives" from "Future Shade" was a finalist in the International Songwriting Competition, where it received an honourable mention.

AIR Awards
The Australian Independent Record Awards (commonly known informally as AIR Awards) is an annual awards night to recognise, promote and celebrate the success of Australia's Independent Music sector.

|-
| rowspan="2" | 2006
|The Sun Never Sets 
| Best Performing Independent Album
| 
|-
| themselves
| Independent Artist of the Year
| 
|-
| rowspan="2" | 2008
|Summerland 
| Best Independent Urban/Hip Hop Album
| 
|-
| themselves
| Best Independent Artist
| 
|-
| 2012
|Future Shade 
| Best Independent Urban/Hip Hop Album
| 
|-

ARIA Music Awards
The ARIA Music Awards is an annual awards ceremony that recognises excellence, innovation, and achievement across all genres of Australian music.

|-
| 2008
| Summerland
| Best Urban Album
| 
|-
| 2012
| Future Shade
| Best Urban Album
| 
|-

J Award
The J Awards are an annual series of Australian music awards that were established by the Australian Broadcasting Corporation's youth-focused radio station Triple J. They commenced in 2005.

|-
| 2005
|The Sun Never Sets
| Australian Album of the Year
| 
|-
| 2008
|"2020"
| Australian Video of the Year
|

References

External links
 Official site
 
 
 

Australian hip hop groups
New South Wales musical groups
Musical groups established in 2001